The Great Vazquez is a 2010 Spanish biographical comedy-drama film directed and written by Óscar Aibar which stars Santiago Segura as the title character alongside Álex Angulo, Mercè Llorens and Enrique Villén.

Plot 
Set in 1960s Barcelona, the plot follows the vicissitudes of Vázquez, a cartoonist and wastrel whose rogue way of living is threatened by the arrival of a foe, Peláez, an accountant hellbent on setting things right in the publishing house.

Cast

Production 
The film is a Distinto Films, Tornasol Films and Castafiore Films production, with the participation of TVE, TVC and Canal+ España. Shooting locations included Barcelona and the Ciudad de la Luz studio in Alicante.

Release 
The Great Vazquez was presented at the 58th San Sebastián International Film Festival in September 2010, screened as part of the festival's main competition. It was theatrically released in Spain on 24 September 2010.

Reception 
In the view of Mark Adams, of ScreenDaily, the film constitutes "a delightful mixture of genial period comedy mixed with comic strip characters bouncing out of the screen".

Carlos Marañón of Cinemanía gave the film 3 out of 5 stars, presenting it as a "Lopezvazquez-esque version of Catch Me If You Can full of city guards", considering that the imbrication of the setting with the lead character's spirit is so-so, while the supporting cast performs well.

Sergi Sánchez of Fotogramas score 3 out of 5 stars, considering that the "faithful portrayal" of the working environment in Franco era and Santiago Segura's "spectacular performance", balancing "tenderness and cynicism", make the film a "pleasant surprise", while considering the animated segments to be "expendable".

Accolades 

|-
| align = "center" rowspan = "5" | 2011 || rowspan = "4" | 3rd Gaudí Awards || colspan = "2" | Best Non-Catalan Language Film ||  ||rowspan = "4" | 
|-
| Best Costume Design || Maria Gil, Sonia Segura || 
|-
| Best Special/Digital Effects || Josep Maria Aragonés || 
|-
| Best Makeup and Hairstyles || Blanca Sánchez, Pepe Quetglas || 
|-
| 25th Goya Awards || Best Supporting Actor || Álex Angulo ||  || align = "center" | 
|}

See also 
 List of Spanish films of 2010

References 

2010s Spanish-language films
Spanish comedy-drama films
2010 comedy-drama films
Films shot at Ciudad de la Luz
Films shot in Barcelona
Live-action films based on comics
Films based on Spanish comics
Cultural depictions of cartoonists
Spanish biographical films
Films set in the 1960s
Films set in Barcelona
Films about comics
Biographical films about artists
2010s Spanish films